Absheron Museum of History and Local Studies() It started its activities on November 21,
1983.

History 
The area of the museum, which was thoroughly renovated in 2015, is 296 square meters and consists of 5 halls. Currently, about 3000 exhibits are preserved in the museum and 1800 items are displayed in the exposition. Exhibits reflecting the history, geography, nature, everyday life and culture of Absheron region are preserved in the museum.

The museum building 
The museum consists of 4 halls, 1 fund room and 1 room for employees. The exhibition area is 250 square meters, the manager's room is 1 square meter, the fund room is 10 square meters, and the staff room is 25 square meters. In 2018, the number of visitors to the museum was 1932. Visitors to the museum are being registered.

See also 
 List of museums in Azerbaijan
 Absheron District

References

External links 
 Keçmişə işıq salan Abşeronun Tarix Diyarşünaslıq Muzeyi

Museum collections
Museums in Azerbaijan
Geology museums
Geology of Azerbaijan